"", also rendered as "", is a short humorous poem in Scots written at an unknown date by William Dunbar (born 1459 or 1460)

The poem takes the form of a dialogue during Lent between two close female confidants who have become indiscreet due to the drinking of wine.

The women are depicted as being insincere in their observation of Lent and of being manipulative with regard to their husbands.

The noun  has no precise equivalent in English. The Concise Scots Dictionary defines it, literally, as a godmother and, figuratively, as "a female intimate or friend; a gossip."

The source texts of the poem are the Bannatyne Manuscript, the Maitland Folio and a side-note in the Minute Book of Sassines of Aberdeen. The texts vary in several respects and the version given in this article is that formulated by William Mackay Mackenzie in 1932.

Synopsis

On the first day of Lent two friends are drinking wine and talking.
One, groaning while she drinks, complains that This long Lent makes me lean.

In spite of being large and fat she insists that she is feeling weak due to the Lenten fast. 
She affirms that This long Lent makes me lean.

Her companion is supportive. She tells her friend that her austere tastes were inherited from her mother.

She says that the late mother would drink no wine except mavasy a strong, sweet, expensive, fortified beverage similar to madeira. This long Lent makes me lean she adds.

She tells the other that she should refrain from fasting and, suggestively, that her husband should suffer instead, then adds This long Lent makes me lean.

The first  agrees with her friend's advice. 
She states that Everything I do is to annoy him then adds that he has little value in bed and proposes a toast; This long Lent makes me lean.

The pair set to drinking a chopin jug of wine.
They are determined

References

Poetry by William Dunbar
Scottish poems
Scottish literature
Medieval poetry
Poetry of the Bannatyne Manuscript